Josef Frühwirth (29 May 1907 – January 1944) was an Austrian international footballer.

References

1907 births
1944 deaths
Association football midfielders
Austrian footballers
Austria international footballers
SK Rapid Wien players
SK Sturm Graz players
Place of birth missing
CA Spora Luxembourg managers
Austrian military personnel killed in World War II